The Call of the Wild is a 1972 family adventure film directed by Ken Annakin and starring Charlton Heston, Michèle Mercier, Raimund Harmstorf, George Eastman, and Maria Rohm.

Based on Jack London's 1903 novel The Call of the Wild, the film follows the adventures of a dog that is brought north to Canada to be used as a sled dog.

Plot 
John Thornton (Charlton Heston) a prospector in the 1897 Klondike Gold Rush is trying to eke out a living in the harsh conditions of the bitterly cold Yukon region of Canada, with Buck the German Shepherd dog he befriends. Thornton struggles against unscrupulous rivals and natural hazards in the extreme conditions and is greatly helped by Buck who has his own story to tell: he was abducted from a family home and taken north to become a working sled dog. Man and dog forge a true bond of friendship, working together to survive life in the treacherous frozen North. Thornton is killed by Yeehat Indians, but Buck kills the men to avenge John Thornton. At the end of the film, Buck comes to the White River to mourn the place where he died.

Cast 
 Charlton Heston – John Thornton
 Michèle Mercier – Calliope Laurent
 Raimund Harmstorf – Pete
 George Eastman – Black Burton (dubbed by Robert Rietty)
 Maria Rohm – Mercedes
 Juan Luis Galiardo – Seze
 Sancho Gracia – Taglish Charlie
 Friedhelm Lehmann – Charles
 Horst Heuck – Hal
 Rik Battaglia – Dutch Harry
 Alfredo Mayo – Judge Miller
 Sverre Wilberg – Colonel

Production 
The film was shot on location in Finland, Norway, and Spain.

Reception 
Charlton Heston in his autobiography In the Arena: An Autobiography made it very clear how unhappy he was with this film and asked people to not watch it. Although it was poorly received upon release, and was not released in the United States until 1975, today the film is seen in a better light. Contemporary British and Irish Film Directors: A Wallflower Critical Guide described it as a "swinging back to action-adventure", starring "Charlton Heston at his best", another in the "long line of Annakin's panoramic films featuring a myriad of beautiful locations".

References

External links 
 

1972 films
French adventure drama films
Italian adventure drama films
Spanish adventure drama films
West German films
British historical adventure films
1970s English-language films
1970s adventure drama films
1970s historical adventure films
Films based on The Call of the Wild
Films directed by Ken Annakin
Films scored by Carlo Rustichelli
British adventure drama films
Films set in the Arctic
Films shot in Finland
Films set in the 1890s
English-language French films
English-language German films
English-language Italian films
English-language Spanish films
1972 drama films
British children's adventure films
German adventure drama films
1970s British films
1970s Italian films
1970s French films
1970s German films